Keezhadi (also as Keeladi) excavation site is a  Sangam age settlement that is being excavated by the Archaeological Survey of India and the Tamil Nadu State Department of Archaeology. This site is located 12 km southeast of Madurai in Tamil Nadu, near the town of Keezhadi in Sivagangai district. It comes under the Thiruppuvanam Taluk of Sivagangai district. This is a large-scale excavation carried out in Tamil Nadu after the Adichanallur archaeological site. The settlement lies on the bank of the Vaigai River and it reflects the ancient culture of Tamil people. Epigraphist V. Vedachalam, who served as a domain expert for the excavation, dated the excavated remains between 6th century BCE and 3rd century CE.

Location 
The excavation was first started in Pallisanthai Thidal which is in the north of Manalur, about a kilometer east of the town of Keezhadi in Sivagangai district. Various archaeological residues were found when plowing the land around the site. A survey was conducted for the study, which found that this ancient settlement was less than two and a half meters below the ground level. The area currently being excavated is spread over 80 acres with a 3.5 km radius. The ancient towns of Kondagai and Manalur are also said to be associated with this region.

Dating of site 
Initially, this site was estimated to be from the period between 5th century BCE and 3rd century CE. Two samples were sent for carbon dating from this excavation site for confirmation in 2017. The results that came in July 2017 confirmed that the samples were from about 2,200 years ago (3rd century BCE). Radiocarbon dating of samples obtained from the fourth phase of excavation revealed that one of the artifacts was from 6th century BCE. In 2017, the ASI sent two samples from Keezhadi to Beta Analytic, a Miami-based radiocarbon dating laboratory. The laboratory dated the samples to be about 2,300 – 2600 years old (from 3rd century BCE). In 2018, six carbon samples collected from the fourth phase of excavation were sent to Beta Analytic in the United States for Accelerator Mass Spectrometry (AMS) dating. It was found that one sample collected at a depth of 353 cm goes back to 580 BCE.

Background and status of study 
An archaeological survey was first conducted in 2013, by Archaeological Survey of India, in the vicinity of the Vaigai river from Theni district to Ramanathapuram district where the river meets the sea. During the study, 293 sites, including Keezhadi, were identified to have archaeological residues. The first three phases of excavation at Keezhadi were conducted by the Archaeological Survey of India while the phases after that were conducted by the Tamil Nadu Archaeology Department.

Phases of Keezhadi excavation

First phase 
In June 2015, an Archaeological Survey of India group led by Amarnath Ramakrishnan started the first phase of the excavation in the area near the Vaigai river in Keezhadi.

Second phase 
The second phase began on 2 January 2016. Various documents, including medical jars, antique kitchen wells, and factory and government seals, were found. At the end of the second phase, more than six thousand artifacts were found. It was confirmed that these artifacts were 2,200 years old when they were tested by radiocarbon dating.

Third phase 
The third phase of the excavation was conducted under the chairmanship of Sri Ramanan of the Archaeological Survey of India from January 2017. The work ended on 30 September 2017. In the third phase, 16 digging sites were selected, taking up a total area of 400 square meters, which is 80 acres of land.

Fourth phase 
The fourth phase of the excavation was conducted between 2017 and 2018, bringing out 5,820 artifacts. This phase was conducted by the Tamil Nadu Archaeology Department while the first three phases were conducted by the Archaeological Survey of India. Six carbon samples collected from the fourth phase of excavation at Keezhadi were sent to Beta Analytic, Miami, Florida, USA for Accelerator Mass Spectrometry (AMS) dating; samples collected at a depth of 353 cm, were dated between 580 BCE and the 1st century CE. The graffiti marks on the artifacts obtained from the excavation site were said to be similar to the Indus Valley script by the excavators. Bisnupriya Basak questioned whether the sherds actually came from the same level that was dated to the 6th century BCE. Some of the marks might have been made during the pottery-making process. Archaeologist  E. Harsha Vardhan commented that  “we cannot state scientifically that the Tamil-Brahmi script belongs to the sixth century BC” on the basis of this report.

Fifth phase 
In June 2019, the Tamil Nadu Archaeology Department began the fifth phase of the excavation led by Dr R Sivanantham. This phase was completed in four to five months in which 15 trenches was planned to be dug. In the 5th stage of excavation, Sangam-era bricks and more than 700 objects were found and these have been sent for testing. , the preliminary report of the fifth phase of excavations was nearing completion.

Sixth phase 
Sixth phase of excavation along with simultaneous excavation in neighbouring villages (Manalur, Kondhagai, and Agaram) began on 19 February 2020.

Seventh phase
The seventh phase was launched on February 13 and began on February 19, 2021.

It came to an end on September 20, 2021.

Eight Phase 
On February 11, 2022, the eighth phase of excavations began.

Findings 

Almost 48 square pits have been cut and various structures and artifacts have been found, including frosts, brick walls, roof tiles, pottery, mimic accessories, skeletal tools, iron Vel, and Tamil-Brahmi letter-etched plates. This place is considered to be Pandyan dynasty's city called "Perumanalur", the pioneer of literature. The use of fired brick, the size of the building complex, an array of pots placed in such a way that it must have been used either as a lamp or for painting, and other findings suggest that the settlement is of a more civilized population than was previously suspected during the Sangam period.

Canals and sewage system 
Water supply and wastewater are considered as important landmarks of civil development. At the bottom of the settlement, there are buildings with a sewage canal facility made of ceramic tubes.

Ring wells and brick walls 
Ancient earthenware and ring wells have been found. Archaeologist Velappan said that this proves the ancient tradition of Tamils indicating that they used these wells in river shores and ponds for water. Brick buildings are considered rare in ancient times but a large number of brick buildings have been found.

Pottery 
The rouletted, arretine-type ceramics brought by merchants demonstrate business connections with the Roman Empire. It is noteworthy that such products have been discovered. Furthermore, black and red parchment fragments and white-colored black, red papillae and reddish-pitted pieces have also been unearthed. There are Tamil words engraved on the potteries that mention the names of individuals like 'Aathan', 'Uthiran' and 'Thiesan'.

Tamil-Brahmi script and graffiti marks
In the fourth phase of excavations at Keezhadi, 72 potsherds with Tamil-Brahmi script were discovered at the site. Some of these artifacts have inscribed graffiti marks, similar to graffiti marks which some believe to have evolved from the Indus script. According to T. Udhayachandran, the artifacts found at Keezhadi excavation site may point to a link between the scripts of the Indus Valley civilization and Tamil-Brahmi. Based on these marks, and one Keezhadi findings of the fourth phase which was dated to 580 BCE, R. Sivanantham and M. Seran argue that the date of the earliest attestation of Tamil-Brahmi can be pushed back to the 6th century BCE, a few centuries older than Dhamma Lipi (Prakrit in the Brahmi Script) of Ashokan Edicts, which is stated to be dated from 268 BC to 232 BC. These claims have been challenged. It is not clear whether the potsherds containing inscriptions were found in the same archaeological layer as the 6th century samples, and University of Calcutta archaeologist Bishnupriya Basak said that "This unfortunately is not clear from the report and is very crucial," adding that the issues of "layer, period and absolute dates" needed clarity. Dravidian University archaeologist E. Harsha Vardhan said that a single report was not enough to "state scientifically that the Tamil-Brahmi script belongs to the sixth century BC”.

Ornaments and antiquities 
Ornaments have been found including sponges, marble, agate beads, green, yellow and blue glass beads. The findings also include elephant tusks, copper ointment and sheets of wire. Rare artifacts including iron edged corners, gold ornaments,stylus, terracotta stamps, diaphragm tiles, firefly toys have been found as well, along with other tools.

Keeladi Cluster 
Keeladi was initially chosen by Amarnath Ramakrishnan and his team at ASI in a search along the banks of Vaigai for the most promising site for a river bank civilization near Madurai and was chosen because of many nearby mounds.

Other sites near Keeladi was jointly brought together with Keeladi as the main site. The Keeladi Cluster includes, Keeladi, Agaram, Manalur, Konthagai (a burial site) and Pasiapuram.

Controversy 
In 2017, some Tamil academicians, including V Arasu (the former head of the Department of Tamil Literature at the University of Madras), alleged that the Bharatiya Janata Party-led central government had made deliberate attempts to stall the excavations at Keezhadi. Arasu claimed that the BJP government had a Hindutva agenda, and wanted to stop the Keezhadi project because the excavations at the site provided an "undeniable evidence of a secular culture in South India".

The ASI normally conducts excavations at a major archaeological site for five seasons (years). In 2016–17, after the conclusion of the second season at Keezhadi, the ASI transferred the Superintending Archaeologist (SA) K. Amarnath Ramakrishna to its Guwahati circle. This caused a controversy in Tamil Nadu, leading to allegations that the ASI had deliberately transferred the SA to stall the project. K. Amarnath Ramakrishna stated that he wanted to complete the excavation work at Keezhadi, and challenged his transfer order before the Central Administrative Tribunal.

The ASI clarified that the transfer was ordered in accordance with the organization's policy, which mandates that the maximum tenure of an SA in a particular circle is only for two years. K Amarnath Ramakrishna had completed more than three years at the Excavation Branch VI, located in Bengaluru, under which the Keezhadi site has been excavated. So, the ASI decided to replace him with P S Sriraman, who had earlier served as a Deputy SA in the Jodhpur circle. K Amarnath Ramakrishna was not the only officer to be transferred; 26 other officers had been transferred all over India. Moreover, the newly appointed SA P S Sriraman was a native of Tamil Nadu.

The Union Ministry also clarified that it had no intention to stop or delay the excavations at Keezhadi. It also explained that there was a delay in allocation of funds for the third season of excavation, because the ministry had not received the report for the work done in the past two years on time. Once the report was submitted, the ministry immediately cleared the funds for the third season of excavations at Keezhadi. The reports of the first two years of research will be released as a book.

Gallery 
The following photographs were taken at the excavation site on 11 October 2016.

See also 

 Arikamedu
 Adichanallur archaeological site
 Kodumanal

References

External links 

 A dead city beneath a living village

Sivaganga district
Archaeological sites in Tamil Nadu
Ancient Tamil Nadu
Prehistoric India
Tamil history
Archaeological cultures in India
Sangam period